Oliver Nash (February 26, 1931 – May 27, 2013) was a politician in the American state of Florida. He served in the Florida House of Representatives from 1959 to 1964, representing Franklin County.

References

1931 births
2013 deaths
Democratic Party members of the Florida House of Representatives
20th-century American politicians